Anne French (born 1956) is a New Zealand editor and poet.

Life
French was born in Wellington, New Zealand. She graduated from Wellington Girls' College and Victoria University of Wellington with an MA.  She worked as an editor for Oxford University Press, becoming New Zealand Managing Editor in 1982, and subsequently New Zealand Publisher. In 1995 she set up Te Papa Press, a publishing business within the Commercial Division of the Museum of New Zealand Te Papa Tongarewa.

Awards
 1973 and 1974 PEN Young Writer’s Incentive Award
 1988 New Zealand Book Award for Poetry
 1988 PEN Best First Book of Poetry Award 
1993 Inaugural Writer in Residence, Massey University

Works

 
 The Male as Evader (1988)
 Cabin Fever (1990)
 Seven Days on Mykonos (1993).
 
 
 The Blue Voyage (2015)

Contributor

Anthologies

References

External links
"Anne French", new zealand electronic poetry centre

1956 births
Living people
20th-century New Zealand poets
New Zealand women poets
People educated at Wellington Girls' College
Victoria University of Wellington alumni
20th-century New Zealand women writers